Better in the Shade is the seventh studio album released by Canadian group Patrick Watson. It was released on April 22, 2022.

Critical reception

Better in the Shade received generally favorable reviews from critics. At Metacritic, which assigns a normalized rating out of 100 to reviews from mainstream publications, the album received an average score of 78 based on 4 reviews.

In the Sputnikmusic review, staff member Sunnyvale praised the album as "the sonic equivalent of living, breathing, human warmth".

Track listing

Charts

References

2022 albums
Patrick Watson (musician) albums